Azrak-Hamway International, Inc. (AHI), was a New York toy company founded in 1964 that initially offered inexpensive novelty-type toy items. In 1974 Azrak-Hamway acquired the Remco Toy name and produced toys of more substance under the Remco brand, including several popular culture licensed items like Universal Monsters, Space 1999, Batman, Marvel Super Heroes and other TV Tie-in products. Azrak-Hamway created the Child Guidance division in 1994 in an effort to produce child learning toys. In 1997 Jakks Pacific acquired Child Guidance and Remco from Azrak-Hamway International. Many of the inexpensive items offered by Azrak-Hamway were licensed products that featured climbing, hanging, or parachuting figures sold on simple bubble cards.

These toys include:
 1973-1981 Official Worlds Famous Super Monsters
 1973 Spider-Man Spider-Car (basis of the Spider-Mobile)
 1974 Batman Batcycle
 1974 Planet of the Apes Water Gun, Parachutist, Helicopter, Stunt Cycle, On Horse, Prison Wagon
 1974 Action Apeman
 1974 Spider-Man Cycle
 1974 Popeye Boatmobile
 1974 M*A*S*H Emergency Hrlicopter
 1974 Mickey Mouse Die Cast Fast Wheels
 1974 Superman Zing Wing
 1974 Flintstones Flintmobile, Road Racing Set
 1975 Flintstones Flintmobile with Flintboat on trailer
 1975 Batman Batmobile & Batboat with trailer
 1975 Batman Stunt Cycle 
 1975 Batman Pat Blane with Launcher
 1975 Star Trek Sky Diving Parachutist, Phaser Ray-Gun, U.S.S. Enterprise Water Gun, Phaser Saucer Gun, Flying Enterprise, Pin Ball Game
 1976 Batman Batmobile
 1976 Batman Walkie-Talkie Playset
 1976 Sky Diving Parachutist (Batman, Penguin, Joker, Shazam!, Spider-Man, Robin) 
 1976 Jet Discs for Star Trek and Space: 1999
 1977 Batman Batmobile Remote Control Car
 1977 Welcome Back, Kotter Desk Set accessories
 1977 Space: 1999 toys
 1977 The Shadow Mobile and Crime Fighter Super Jet
 1978 Parachuting toys (Spider-Man, Hulk, Planet of the Apes)
 1979 Captain America, Fantastic Four Parachutists
 1979 The Incredible Hulk Power Spouter Water Gun, Parachutist, Van, Stunt Cycle
 1979 Neck Pets
 1979 Star Fleet Wind-Up Robot and Walkie-Talkie
 1982 Sgt. Rock Stunt Cycle and Parachutist Commando
 1983 The Mighty Crusaders Helicopter

For toy collectors, the most significant AHI toy contribution was the Official World Famous Super Monsters toyline, licensed from Universal Studios. These toys, released in 1973 (with additional monsters added through 1976) were an effort to capitalize on the Mego Corporation's popular Mad Monster Line. The set of 8-inch action figures included: Frankenstein, Dracula, Wolfman, Mummy and the Creature from the Black Lagoon. All except Dracula were officially licensed from Universal Studios. 
 
The Mego Corporation forced Azrak-Hamway to remove their line "Action Apemen" through injunction, as it was agreed to infringe on Mego's license rights to produce Planet of the Apes figures (Mego outbid AHI on the figure license, even though AHI produced many ancillary Planet of the Apes products).

References

External links
AHI tribute site featuring many catalogs

Toy companies of the United States
Defunct toy manufacturers
Defunct companies based in New York (state)
Companies based in New York (state)